Fort Getty is a town park in Jamestown, Rhode Island, on Conanicut Island in Narragansett Bay. From 1900 through World War II it was a military fort. The Town of Jamestown later received the property and opened it as a park, primarily a campground.

History
Fort Getty's construction began in 1901 to defend the West Passage of Narragansett Bay as part of the Coast Defenses of Narragansett Bay (renamed Harbor Defenses in 1925). The fort was named for Colonel George W. Getty, who had a distinguished career in the Mexican–American War, American Civil War, and afterward. The fort's three gun batteries were completed by 1905 but for some reason were not accepted until 1910. They were Battery Tousard with three 12-inch M1900 guns (305 mm) on disappearing carriages, Battery House with two 6-inch M1900 guns (152 mm) on pedestal mounts, and Battery Whiting with two 3-inch M1903 guns (76 mm) on pedestal mounts. 

Battery Tousard was named for Louis de Tousard, an engineer and artillery officer with much involvement in early American fortifications. Battery House was named for Major General James House, who commanded Fort Wolcott in Newport in 1811. Battery Whiting was named for Levi Whiting, an artillery officer in the War of 1812.

Fort Getty went into caretaker status soon after completion, but was garrisoned in World War I as a sub-post of Fort Greble. 

Early in World War II the fort's location was largely superseded by new defenses centered on Fort Church and Fort Greene. In 1942 the 12-inch guns were scrapped, Battery House's 6-inch guns were relocated to Fort Varnum, and Battery Whiting's 3-inch guns were relocated to Fort Burnside. The fort became a prisoner-of-war camp for German prisoners. However, in 1943 a new Anti-Motor Torpedo Boat Battery, AMTB 922 with four 90 mm guns arrived. Two of the guns were on fixed mounts and two were on towed mounts. 

In 1948 the fort was disestablished, as were essentially all US coast defenses.

Visiting today
Dutch Island, the site of the former Fort Greble, lies near the fort and is a short boat ride from Fort Getty Park. The park also has facilities for RVs. As of 2015 there are 83 seasonal RV sites and 24 tent sites. The gun batteries have been partially buried but portions are still visible. The park has many amenities including a dock at the tip of Beaverhead and a pavilion which is popularly used for birthdays, graduations, and weddings.

See also
 Seacoast defense in the United States
 United States Army Coast Artillery Corps

References

External links
 Fort Getty Contact information
 List of all US coastal forts and batteries at the Coast Defense Study Group, Inc. website
 FortWiki, lists all CONUS and Canadian forts

Installations of the United States Army
Parks in Rhode Island
Getty
Buildings and structures in Newport County, Rhode Island
Protected areas of Newport County, Rhode Island
Buildings and structures in Jamestown, Rhode Island
World War II prisoner of war camps in the United States
Military installations closed in 1948